Mountain Cemetery is a cemetery located in Sonoma, California in the United States. Founded in 1841, it is located in the Sonoma Plaza Historic District, which is located on the National Register of Historic Places.

History

The  that comprise Mountain Cemetery were owned by Mariano Guadalupe Vallejo. Vallejo eventually sold the acreage to numerous individuals. While the earliest burials at the site started in the 1840s, the origins of the cemetery's founding, and how the land was donated to the City, remains unknown. The cemetery is located on the southeastern side of Schocken Hill and a few blocks off the Sonoma Plaza to the northwest.

Mountain Cemetery's burials include William Smith, the only known Revolutionary War veteran buried in the state of California and the oldest proven burial in the cemetery; Mariano and Francisca Vallejo; and local families who have influenced the food and wine industry, including the founder of Sebastiani Vineyards, Samuele Sebastiani. A Native American child is also buried in the cemetery, which is rare given that an estimated 900 Californian Native peoples are believed to be buried half a mile away in unmarked graves near Mission San Francisco Solano. Two members of the Donner party are also buried in the cemetery.

The oldest graves and retaining walls were built by hand by stonemasons. The style, which includes mortar joints and the use of basalt, reflects the stonework seen in select 19th-century buildings, walls, and bridges in Sonoma. The basalt used to build the early walls and gravesites was likely sourced from now defunct quarries on Schocken Hill. 

Mountain Cemetery is owned, operated, and maintained by the City of Sonoma with the support of local volunteers. Much of the older sections of the cemetery are overgrown and in disrepair. The cemetery has repeatedly lost money for the City. Despite having a fund to support the cemetery maintenance and care, the City has subsidized the fund repeatedly from the its General Fund. As of 1993, the cemetery cost the City $40,000 to maintain annually, not including security and graffiti removal. That year, a City Councilmember proposed contracting a private company to operate the cemetery. The proposal did not pass. At the end of the 1990s, the City's General Fund lost approximately $500,000 to the maintenance of the cemetery, which has never been recouped. 

As of 2005, the annual maintenance for the cemetery was $250,000. In 2006, the Sonoma City Council approved the construction of a half-million dollar mausoleum. The mausoleum added an additional ten years of space with stacked caskets and cremains. Two years later, in 2008, the deficit was $600,000. As of 2018, Mountain Cemetery had cremation niches and above ground full burial crypts available in one mausoleum.

A veterans cemetery is located to the east of Mountain Cemetery's entrance. Despite its proximity, it is not part of Mountain Cemetery.

Numerous hiking trails are located in the cemetery. The Overlook Trail winds past the burial plots and up the hillside into Montini Open Space Preserve. The trail passes by the gravesite of William Montini, Sr., the preserve's namesake. The Toyon Trailhead leads hikers into less visited areas of the cemetery.

Notable burials

Henry Ernest Boyes, entrepreneur, Navy captain and founder of Boyes Hot Springs
Mary Fazio (1913-1999), founder of Mary's Pizza Shack
George Fetters, founder of Fetters Hot Springs
William Smith (1768–1846), ship captain and Revolutionary war veteran
Mariano Guadalupe Vallejo (1807-1890), military general, politician, and founder of Sonoma
Francisca Benicia Carrillo de Vallejo (1815-1891), pioneer and wife of Mariano Guadalupe Vallejo

Gallery

References

External links

Mountain Cemetery at Find a Grave
"Mountain Cemetery defaced with graffiti" from the Sonoma Index-Tribune in 2021

1841 establishments in the United States
Sonoma, California
Cemeteries on the National Register of Historic Places in California